Damianowo  is a village in the administrative district of Gmina Udanin, within Środa Śląska County, Lower Silesian Voivodeship, in south-western Poland. 

The village was once an estate of the Richthofen family.

References

Damianowo